Lemont is a rural locality in the local government areas of Northern Midlands and Southern Midlands in the Central region of Tasmania. The 2016 census determined a population of 22 for the state suburb of Lemont.

History
Lemont was gazetted as a locality in 1972.

Geography
The locality is mostly open farming country, surrounded on three sides by timbered hills.

Road infrastructure
The C305 route (Tooms Lake Road) enters from the north-west and runs through to the north-east before exiting. Route C307 (Lemont Road) enters from the west and runs south before exiting. Route C306 (Stonehouse Road) starts at an intersection with C307 on the western boundary and runs east and north through the locality to an intersection with C305, where it ends.

References

Localities of Northern Midlands Council
Localities of Southern Midlands Council
Towns in Tasmania